Aq Taqeh may refer to:
 Aq Taqeh-ye Jadid
 Aq Taqeh-ye Qadim

See also
 Aq Toqeh